Francisco Veredas Bandeiras better known as Paco Bandeira (born 2 May 1945, Elvas, Portugal) is a musician from Portugal.

He is known for representing his country in the second edition of the OTI Festival in 1973 which was held in Belo Horizonte.

Bandeira stood trial in 2012 on suspicion of domestic violence.

References

1946 births
Living people
20th-century Portuguese male singers